Polyommatus zapvadi, the Valley Zap blue, is a butterfly of the family Lycaenidae. It was described by Carbonell in 1993. It is found in Turkey.

References

 The Butterflies Monitoring & Photography Society in Turkey

Butterflies described in 1993
Polyommatus
Butterflies of Asia
Butterflies of Europe